Kirpi (“Hedgehog”) is a Turkish comedy film. It is based on a novel by Sulhi Dölek. Dölek died in 2005 and upon his last request, the novel was adopted in to a movie in 2009.

Plot 
Reşat is a nervous and vindictive character. Whenever he feels he has been hard done by, he revenges in satirical plots. These plots are usually harmless but annoying. He likes drawing a hedgehog as his signature. When a stranger jumps the queue while he is paying his bill in a cash office he decides to revenge by frightening him by a fake telephone message. But it turns out that his opponent Tahir is also vindictive. So they began to create plots to make a mockery of each other. But somehow these plots help the police to arrest mafia gang. At the end they make friends with each other.

Cast

References

Turkish comedy films
2000s Turkish-language films
2009 films
2009 comedy films